Kanz al-Ummal Fee Sunan al-Aqwal wa al-Af'al, known in English as Treasures of the Doers of Good Deeds, is a Sunni hadith collection, collected by the Islamic scholar Ali ibn Abd-al-Malik al-Hindi (1472 CE - 1567 CE).

Description

Kanz al-Ummal is an arrangement of Jalaluddin al-Suyuti's work, Jami' al-Kabir. It contains around 46,000 hadith, which are an assortment of varying reliability. Hadith found in it are quoted without a full chain and there are potentially fabricated hadith in the work.

Editions
First Published by Dā’irat al-Ma‘ārif Hyderabad Deccan, edited by the scholars of Jamia Nizamia.
Published by Dār al-Kutub al-‘Ilmīyah, Lebanon, 1998, edited by Mahmud Umar al-Dumyati.

See also
List of Sunni books

References

Sunni literature
Sunni hadith collections
15th-century Indian books
16th-century Indian books
15th-century Arabic books
16th-century Arabic books
Islamic literature
Indian religious texts
Indian non-fiction books